Uvaria macrophylla, also known by its common name large-leaved uvaria, is a species of flowering plant in the family Annonaceae. The species was originally described by William Roxburgh in 1832. The name is a synonym of Uvaria littoralis (Blume) Blume.

References

Taxa named by William Roxburgh
macrophylla